Peter Marc Jacobson (born October 27, 1957) is an American television writer, director, producer, and actor. He is best known as the showrunner of the popular sitcom The Nanny, which he created and produced with his then-wife, Fran Drescher, who also starred in the series. He was often credited as Peter Marc in his early acting roles.

Career

Producer
The Nanny (executive producer; 122 episodes, 1993–1999), (co-executive producer; 23 episodes, 1993–1994)
What I Like About You (consulting producer; 18 episodes, 2004–2005),  (co-executive producer; 16 episodes, 2005–2006)
Happily Divorced (executive producer; 22 episodes, 2011–2013)

Writer
Who's the Boss? (1984; unknown number of episodes)
The Nanny (145 episodes, 1993–1999)
What I Like About You (5 episodes, 2004–2006)
Happily Divorced (10 episodes, 2011)
Country Comfort (2 episodes, 2021)

Actor
Wonder Woman(TV Series) 'Spaced Out'episode(1979) - Brad (credited as Peter Marc)
Gorp (1980) - Steinberg
The Big Brawl (1980) - Jug
Lunch Wagon (1981) - Jed
Movers & Shakers (1985) - Robin
Dangerous Love (1988) - Jay
Booker (1990, TV Series) - Paul
Murphy Brown (1990, TV Series) - Nick
We're Talkin' Serious Money (1992) - Jacubick's #1 Goon
Babes (1991, TV Series) - Ed
Beverly Hills, 90210 (1991, TV Series) - Neil
Matlock (1990–1993, TV Series) - Wayne Drummond / Personal Trainer Harry Slade
The Nanny (1994–1999, TV Series) - Man Exiting Restroom with Fly Open / Man at the Bar / Romeo Actor
Spread (2009) - Plastic Surgeon
Happily Divorced (2 episodes, 2011)

Director
The Nanny Reunion: A Nosh to Remember (2004)
Happily Divorced (2 episodes, 2012)

Personal life
Jacobson and Fran Drescher married in 1978 and moved to Los Angeles to launch their careers. Both are Jewish.
 

The couple divorced in 1999, after being separated for years. The couple had no children. He came out as gay to her after their marriage ended. The couple developed the 2011 television series Happily Divorced for TV Land based on their lives.

References

External links

 
 Film Reference bio
 New York Times career review

1957 births
20th-century American male actors
20th-century American writers
21st-century American male actors
21st-century American writers
Jewish American male actors
American male television actors
American television directors
American television writers
American gay actors
American gay writers
LGBT television directors
LGBT people from New York (state)
LGBT producers
Living people
Male actors from New York City
American male television writers
Queens College, City University of New York alumni
Television producers from New York City
Writers from Queens, New York
Activists from New York (state)
20th-century American male writers
Screenwriters from New York (state)
20th-century American Jews
21st-century American Jews
20th-century LGBT people
21st-century LGBT people
LGBT Jews